The St. Sergius Orthodox Theological Institute (French: Institut de théologie orthodoxe Saint-Serge) in Paris, France, is a private university of higher education in Orthodox theology. Founded in 1925 by a group led by Metropolitan Eulogius Georgiyevsky, historian, theologian, and last Minister of Religious Affairs of the Russian Provisional Government, Anton Kartashev, Lev Liperovsky and Mikhail Ossorguine, with the active support of Nobel Peace Prize recipient John Mott. It is under the canonical jurisdiction of the Archdiocese of Russian Orthodox churches in Western Europe under the omophorion of the Russian Orthodox Church.

The institute has been in conformity with French legislation and the norms of European university education since its earliest years and is accredited by the Académie de Paris to deliver bachelor, masters and doctoral degrees. The mission of the institute is to form educated priests and laypeople, intending them to serve actively the Orthodox Church and representing it in ecumenical dialogue as well as in the religious and cultural life of their own country.

History 
The institute's building was originally a German Protestant church. Friedrich von Bodelschwingh bought the site to construct a church, a school and other facilities to help German workers in Paris.

The original faculty and their immediate successors included some of the most notable names in Russian intellectual history: economist, philosopher and theologian Sergei Bulgakov who became the dean; Anton Kartashev; Georgy Fedotov; Boris Vysheslavtsev; Archpriest Basil Zenkovsky; Archpriest Georges Florovsky, pioneer of Orthodox neopatristics and of the ecumenical movement; Archimandrite Cyprian Kern, patrologist and liturgist; Archpriest Nicolas Afanassieff, professor of canon law; New Testament scholar Bishop Cassian Bézobrazov; Léon Zander, another pioneer of the ecumenical movement; Alexander Schmemann; John Meyendorff; and diplomat Constantin Andronikof, personal interpreter for several French presidents and prolific translator of Russian-language theological classics.

Education

The St. Sergius Institute: 
 Offers a complete program of licentiate, masters and doctoral degrees 
 Serves as a centre of theological education by correspondence
 Is a centre of pastoral training
 Provides teaching in the sacred arts, iconography and liturgical singing
 Serves as a laboratory for research in religious history and science
 Contains a library of more than 35,000 books and rare journals
 Is a place of meeting and colloquia, including the annual "Liturgical Week" sessions

Teaching is in the French language.

Notable alumni and professors
Alumni 
 George Khodr - Greek Orthodox Metropolitan of Mount Lebanon
 Ignatius IV (Hazim) - Greek Orthodox Patriarch of Antioch and All the East
 John Meyendorff
 Alexander Schmemann

Professors
 Nicolas Afanassieff
 Élisabeth Behr-Sigel
 Boris Bobrinskoy
 Sergueï Boulgakov
 Olivier Clément
 Sophie Deicha
 Paul Evdokimov
 Georges Florovsky
 Anton Kartachev
 John Meyendorff
 Alexander Schmemann
 Atanasije Jevtić

See also
Saint Vladimir's Orthodox Theological Seminary

References

External links

Official website (French)
OrthodoxWiki article

Eastern Orthodox seminaries
Education in Paris
Eastern Orthodox church buildings in Paris